The following is the discography of American music group Day26.

Studio albums

Extended plays

Singles

Video albums

Music videos

2008
 March: Got Me Going
 July: Since You’ve Been Gone

2009
 April: Imma Put It On Her (feat. P. Diddy and Yung Joc)
 April: So Good
 April: Stadium Music
 April: Girlfriend
 April:  Then There’s You
 April: Truth Is a Lie
 April: Just Getting Started
 April: Perfectly Blind

2012
 Jan: Made Love Lately

References

5. ^https://www.youtube.com/watch?v=ZvZE7w-F770 Willie says Day26 is over 
6. ^https://www.youtube.com/watch?v=33dsHfVuzNM Brian on break-up

External links
 

Discographies of American artists